Music for Misfits is a compilation album by American rapper Big B. It was released on June 21, 2011 via Suburban Noize Records. All songs were previously released on earlier works except "Last One" and "Bad Girl", which were later released on 2013's Fool's Gold.

Track listing
 "Bad Girl" - 3:39
 "Friends or Foes" (featuring Karlos Paez of B-Side Players) - 3:47
 "Last One" - 3:16
 "For Tonight" (featuring Scott Russo) - 3:39
 "Sinner" (featuring Scott Russo) - 3:30
 "Good Times" - 3:15
 "Before I Leave This Place" (featuring Everlast) - 4:17
 "Hooligan" - 3:19
 "Out Here in Cali" - 3:26
 "White Trash Renegade" - 3:33
 "White Trash Life" - 2:56
 "Criminal" - 3:47
 "American Dream" - 3:30
 "Somebody" - 3:36
 "A Million Miles" (featuring Tech N9NE) - 3:50
 "Let's Go Play" - 3:40
 "Rockstar" - 3:26

References

Big B (rapper) albums
2011 compilation albums
Suburban Noize Records compilation albums